The ruins of the Wolfsburg by the western approach to Neustadt an der Weinstraße in the German state of Rhineland-Palatinate, lie on a rocky crag on the Wolfsberg hill about 130 metres over the left (northern) bank of the Speyerbach at a height of 270 metres above sea level (NN). From here the original thalweg may still be made out in the direction of Lambrecht, along which traces of Roman settlements were uncovered.

Literature

References 

Castles in Rhineland-Palatinate
Neustadt an der Weinstraße
Electoral Palatinate